The Targum of Lamentations (TgLam) is an Aramaic rendering of the biblical Book of Lamentations. Like all other targumim, TgLam renders the biblical book into Aramaic while incorporating rabbinic interpretations into the resultant text. TgLam probably originated in the early centuries of the Common Era as a result of Lamentations' use in the liturgical worship of Tisha b’Av, the day commemorating the destruction of Jerusalem. Reference to the use of a targum of Lamentations during Tisha b'Av services appears in the seventh-century text Soferim (42b). The extant versions of TgLam incorporate rabbinic traditions and may date to as late as the eighth century CE. The earliest manuscript of TgLam is Codex Solger MS 1-7.2∫, dated 1291 CE. TgLam's Aramaic mixes elements of eastern and western dialects. There are two primary textual traditions, that of western texts and those of Yemenite provenance.

Content
The targumist faced two theological challenges: the historical reality that Jerusalem and the Lord's Temple had been destroyed not once, but twice (in 586 BCE by the Babylonians and in 70 CE by the Romans), and the text of the Book of Lamentations itself, which challenges God directly. TgLam renders the first four verses of the Hebrew text with an extensive description of the sins of God's people, from Adam and Eve's rebellion to the refusal of the People of Israel to observe the Day of Atonement. The amount of additional material quickly declines so that the book's last three chapters are largely rendered verbatim. Yet when additions are made, they speak either to the deservedness of Israel's punishment or calling Israel back to right worship of God.

The targumist's concern to demonstrate Israel's sin and rebellion against God responds to the biblical author's challenge to God's justice in allowing the destruction of Jerusalem and the death and suffering of so many. The targumist addresses this concern by following rabbinic interpretation of the destruction of Jerusalem, systematically demonstrating God's justice in punishing Israel, and showing that repentance and obedience to Torah will enable Israel to be received by God “perfected in the world to come.”

Sources
  Brady, Christian M.M. “Targum Lamentations’ Reading of the Book of Lamentations” (1MB pdf), Doctoral Thesis, Oxford, 2000.
 Brady, Christian M.M. The Rabbinic Targum of Lamentations: Vindicating God (Leiden: Brill, 2003). .
 Sperber, A. The Bible in Aramaic, vol. IVa  (Leiden: Brill, 1968). .
 Brady's English translation of Targum Lamentations.

Lamentations
Jewish texts in Aramaic
1st-millennium texts
Book of Lamentations